The Gatineau Flames are a Canadian junior ice hockey team based in Buckingham, Quebec.  The team is a member of the Quebec Junior Hockey League, but was a member of the Eastern Ontario Junior Hockey League for decades, ending in 2015.

History
Originally known as the Voisins de Papineau (Papineau Neighbours), the Neighbours lost in the 1999 final and won the 2000 Eastern Ontario Junior "B" title despite being from the Province of Quebec.  In 2002, the team became the Buckingham Mustangs.  In 2003, the team expanded their name by becoming the Gatineau Mustangs.

In 2006, the Mustangs hosted the 2006 Coupe Dodge, the Hockey Quebec Junior "AA" championships.  Coming in the Mustangs defeated Les Rebels de Trois-Pistoles 4-3, and then beat the Express de Suroît 6-5. In the first elimination round the Mustangs were defeated by the eventual finalist, Marquis de Jonquière, in an 8-5 heart breaker.

At the conclusion of the 2014-15 season, the league announced it was re-organizing to become more of a dedicated developmental league to the Central Canada Hockey League and renamed the league Central Canada Hockey League Tier 2.  Initially,  the league was to downsize to twelve teams (one feeder club for each Tier 1 team), however it reduced to 16 teams, eliminating 6 of the current franchises, including the Akwesasne Wolves, Morrisburg Lions, Almonte Thunder, Gananoque Islanders, Gatineau Mustangs and Shawville Pontiacs.

In May 2015, Gatineau announced they were joining the Quebec Junior Hockey League by purchasing the Lachine Maroons franchise and re-locating it to Buckingham. They were forced to change their name to the Flames, as the Vaudreuil-Dorion Mustangs were existing members of the QJHL.

Season-by-season results
{|class="wikitable"
|- align="center" style="color: #C0C0C0" bgcolor=" #E30022"
| Season || GP || W || L || T || OTL || GF ||	GA || P ||  Results  || Playoffs
|- align="center" bgcolor="#eeeeee"
|1999-00      ||42  	||28  	||13  	||1  	||1  	||210  	||160  	||59	||1st EO Metro	||Won League
|- align="center" bgcolor="#eeeeee"
|2000-01      ||42  	||25 	||16 	||3 	||1 	||153 	||151 	||54	||4th EO Metro	||Lost Preliminary
|- align="center" bgcolor="#eeeeee"
|2001-02      ||40  	||9 	||29 	||2 	||0 	||124 	||205 	||20	||5th EO Metro	||Lost Preliminary
|- align="center" bgcolor="#eeeeee"
|2002-03	  ||40  	||21 	||16 	||3 	||1 	||195 	||162 	||46	||3rd EO Metro	||Lost Division Final
|- align="center" bgcolor="#eeeeee"
|2003-04      ||40  	||28 	||11 	||1 	||3 	||235 	||163 	||60	||2nd EO Metro	||Lost Division Final
|- align="center" bgcolor="#eeeeee"
|2004-05	 ||40   	||16 	||20 	||2 	||2 	||153 	||225 	||36 	||4th EO Metro	||Lost Preliminary
|- align="center" bgcolor="#eeeeee"
|2005-06	 ||40   	||11	||25  ||1	||3	||162	||225	||26	||5th EO Metro	||Lost Preliminary
|- align="center" bgcolor="#eeeeee"
|2006-07	 ||40   	||25	||14  ||0	||1	||229	||164	||51	||2nd EO Metro  ||Lost Final
|- align="center" bgcolor="#eeeeee"
|2007-08	 ||39       ||28   ||8    ||1   ||2    ||238   ||121    ||59	||1st EO Metro||Lost Division S-Final
|- align="center" bgcolor="#eeeeee"
|2008-09	 ||40      ||15   ||20   ||3   ||2    ||162   ||201    ||35	||4th EO Metro||
|- align="center" bgcolor="#eeeeee"
|2009-10	 ||44      ||27   ||14   ||2   ||1    ||217   ||155    ||57    ||3rd EO Metro  ||Lost Division S-Final
|- align="center" bgcolor="#eeeeee"
|2010-11	 ||42      ||14   ||26   ||1   ||1    ||138   ||154    ||30    ||5th EO Metro   ||DNQ
|- align="center" bgcolor="#eeeeee"
|2011-12	 ||42      ||28   ||7    ||6   ||1    ||217   ||141    ||63    ||1st EO Metro   ||Lost Final
|- align="center" bgcolor="#eeeeee"
|2012-13	 ||41     ||27   ||11   ||-   ||2    ||199   ||117    ||57    ||2nd EO Metro   ||
|- align="center" bgcolor="#eeeeee"
|2013-14	 ||41     ||21   ||15   ||-   ||5    ||180   ||166    ||47    ||4th EO Metro   ||
|- align="center" bgcolor="#eeeeee"
|2014-15	 ||40      ||23   ||16   ||-   ||1    ||186   ||159    ||47    ||4th EO Metro   ||Won Div. Semi-final, 4-0 (Beavers) Won Div. Finals, 4-2 (Golden Knights)Lost Conference, 2-4 (Rams)
|- align="center" bgcolor="#eeeeee"
|2015-16	 ||55      ||7    ||42   ||6   ||0    ||192  ||318   ||20    ||6 of 6 St Louis12 of 12 QJHL   ||DNQ
|- align="center" bgcolor="#eeeeee"
|2016-17	 ||49     ||15   ||28   ||4   ||2    ||206  ||283   ||36    ||6 of 6 St Louis10 of 12 QJHL   ||DNQ
|- align="center" bgcolor="#eeeeee"
|2017-18	 ||49     ||28   ||16   ||3   ||2    ||220  ||218   ||61    ||3 of 6 St Louis5 of 12 QJHL ||Lost Div. quarterfinal, 2-4 (Panthers)
|- align="center" bgcolor="#eeeeee"
|2018-19     ||48     ||16   ||30   || -  ||2    ||164  ||236   ||34    ||11 of 13 QJHL  ||DNQ
|- align="center" bgcolor="#eeeeee"
|2019-20     ||48     ||12   ||34   || -  ||2    ||154  ||260   ||26    ||6th Trévi     ||DNQ
|- align="center" bgcolor="#eeeeee"
|2021-21     ||       ||     ||     ||    ||     ||     ||      ||     ||                ||DNQ    
|- align="center" bgcolor="#eeeeee"
|2022-23     ||       ||     ||     ||    ||     ||     ||      ||     ||                ||     |}

External links
Gatineau Flames Webpage

Eastern Ontario Junior B Hockey League teams
Ice hockey teams in Quebec
Ice hockey in Gatineau
1997 establishments in Quebec
Ice hockey clubs established in 1997